A number of countries maintain laws requiring the presentation of information concerning actions of the government of Germany regarding Jews in its territory during the period of that government's control by the National Socialist (Nazi) German Worker's Party from 1933 to 1945, commonly referred to as the Holocaust. In the United States, laws of this kind are maintained by individual states and typically specify curriculum content and the ages of the pupils to which various portions of the curricula are to be presented.

Many of the particulars of conformance with these laws are specified or influenced by policies and pronouncements of the Task Force for International Cooperation on Holocaust Education, Holocaust Remembrance, and Holocaust Research. A country's membership in this organization, however, does not necessarily imply any legal mandate within the said country regarding Holocaust education.

Laws prohibiting "Holocaust denial" are maintained by many—but not all—of the same jurisdictions that have these laws.  These laws apply to individuals and involve criminal punishment and therefore they are in all cases separate statutes.

Nations and U.S. states
As of June of 2022, laws mandating education in the Holocaust were on the books in Austria, France, Germany, Hungary, Israel, the Netherlands, Poland, Switzerland, Sweden, the United Kingdom, Canada, Australia, and New Zealand.

In the United States, the states of Arizona, Arkansas, California, Colorado, Connecticut, Delaware, Florida, Illinois, Kentucky, Maine, Michigan, Missouri, Nebraska, New Hampshire, New Jersey, New York, North Carolina, Oklahoma, Oregon, Pennsylvania, Rhode Island, Texas, and Wisconsin. In total, 23 states have mandatory Holocaust education.

References

External links
 Task Force for International Cooperation on Holocaust Education, Remembrance, and Research
 United States Holocaust Memorial Museum State Profiles on Holocaust Education

The Holocaust
Education law
Holocaust historiography